Kryvyi Rih State Pedagogical University  (also referred to as KDPU) was founded in 1930 as a University of Vocational Training, is the oldest pedagogical institution in Kryvyi Rih, Ukraine, reorganized in Pedagogical University. In the prewar period the university has trained about 1,000 teachers. in 1999 on the basis of the State Pedagogical University was established Kryvyi Rih State Pedagogical University. The proclamation of the independence of Ukraine in 1991 brought about radical changes in every sphere of University life. In 2011 Cabinet of Ukraine founded Kryvyi Rih National University. It existed for 5 years and was divided into three separate institutions again in 2016.

The university is administered in nine divisions — PhysMath, Biological, Geographical, Historical, Ukrainian philology, Foreign languages, Education and Fine Arts — and its faculty are divided into 29 departments and programs. Many of these programs are terminate with the master's degree.

Faculties
 Faculty of Mathematics and Physics
 Faculty of Natural Sciences
 Ukrainian Philology Faculty
 Faculty of Foreign Languages
 Faculty of Education
 Faculty of Geography
 Faculty of History
 Faculty of Fine Arts (departments of graphic arts and of musical education)
 Faculty of Industrial Education

Degree programs

The university administers 29 degree-granting programs. It also offers joint-degree programs with several of KNU's professional schools, as well as opportunities for advanced non-degree study.

References

External links

Kryvyi Rih National University
Universities established in the 20th century
Universities and colleges in Kryvyi Rih
Educational institutions established in 1930
1930 establishments in Ukraine
Teachers colleges